"So Long, Farewell" is a song from Rodgers and Hammerstein’s 1959 musical, The Sound of Music. It was included in the original Broadway run and was first performed by the Von Trapp children, played by Kathy Dunn, David Gress, Evanna Lien, Mary Susan Locke, Lauri Peters, Marilyn Rogers, Joseph Stewart, and Frances Underhill. "So Long, Farewell" and "Do-Re-Mi" are the only songs which predominantly feature the Von Trapp children. They first perform the song on their own late in the first act for their parents' party guests; when it is reprised near the end of the second act they are joined by Maria (Mary Martin) and The Captain (Theodore Bikel).

Description
"So Long, Farewell" is a simple composition that effectively exploits the children's higher voices and innocent charm. There is one main chorus, repeated several times throughout the song, which is entirely in a major key. It is designed to be a children's song.

Legacy
"So Long, Farewell" was featured in the 1965 film and spoofed in an episode of Family Guy as well a Kia commercial in 2006. It is one of the last songs written by Oscar Hammerstein II, who died nine months after the play opened.

The band Laibach released a video for So Long, Farewell on March 14, 2019. It depicts a Goebbels type family eating dinner in a bunker next to the Swastika Christmas tree from John Heartfield's O Tannenbaum im deutschen Raum, wie krumm sind deine äste!. The father (played by Ivan Novak) finishes eating and then leads them one by one through the basement door. According to Laibach the symbolism of this video is that the Von Trapp family never left Nazi controlled Austria but simply went "underground" much like how North Koreans are trapped in their totalitarian country. In their own words, the Sound of Music ends in "captivity and death." This music video also includes a reference to Josef Fritzl with the father leading his children to the basement. Milan Fras makes a physical appearance at the end of the video as a nun.

References

1959 songs
Songs from The Sound of Music
Songs with music by Richard Rodgers
Songs with lyrics by Oscar Hammerstein II